Domyat may refer to:

 Damietta Governorate, one of the governorates of Egypt
 Damietta, a port and the capital of the Damietta Governorate in Egypt
 Damietta SC, an association football club based in Damietta
 Dimyat (wine), a white Bulgarian wine grape